The 1894–95 Football League season fell in what was to be called Villa's golden era. Under George Ramsay's management committee Villa won the FA Cup for the second time.

A league match in November 1894 against Sheffield United at Perry Barr was played in driving freezing rain. Villa's players had dry clothes available, and were given hot drinks, a courtesy apparently not extended to the visitors. The Sheffield players were worse affected, several needing treatment for exposure, and by the end of the match only six were still on the field. Villa's Jack Devey put on an overcoat, and Charlie Athersmith played under an umbrella borrowed from a spectator before collapsing in the dressing-room afterwards.

Villa registered the biggest away win	in the League when they defeated Wolverhampton Wanderers 0–4 on 22 December 1894, and beat  Small Heath in the final of the Mayor of Birmingham's Charity Cup.

Twenty thousand people saw Sunderland win the championship with a 2–1 scoreline and rendered  Everton's final game meaningless. As it was, Everton could only draw that game at Aston Villa 2–2, a result which would have taken the title to Sunderland regardless.

The 1895 FA Cup Final was contested by Aston Villa and West Bromwich Albion at Crystal Palace. Aston Villa won 1–0, with Bob Chatt being credited with scoring the fastest goal in FA Cup Final history, scored after just 30 seconds. This record would stand for 114 years before being broken by Louis Saha of Everton in the 2009 FA Cup Final with a goal after 25 seconds.

First Division final table

References

1894-95
English football clubs 1894–95 season